The following is a list of episodes of the Australian television show Wicked Science which aired for two seasons between 2004 and 2006.

Series overview

Episodes

Series 1 (2004)
 Filmed in 2003.
 Aired in 2004 on Network Ten.
(Episode information retrieved from Australian Television Information Archive).

Series 2 (2005–2006) 
 Filmed between 2004–2005.
 Aired between 2005–2006 on Network Ten.
(Episode information retrieved from Australian Television Information Archive).

References

Wicked Science
Wicked Science
Wicked Science
Wicked Science